Stine Hjermstad Kirkevik (born 24 January 1976) is a Norwegian ski-orienteering competitor and world champion.

She won four gold medals at the World Ski Orienteering Championships, in 2004 and 2005. She won the overall World Cup in Ski Orienteering in 2006, and finished 3rd in 2001. She represented the club Asker SK.

References

1976 births
Living people
People from Asker
Norwegian orienteers
Female orienteers
Ski-orienteers
Sportspeople from Viken (county)